Clarence Ossie "Pop-Boy" Smith (May 23, 1892 – February 16, 1924) was a Major League Baseball pitcher who played for three seasons. He played for the Chicago White Sox in 1913 and the Cleveland Indians from 1916 to 1917.

External links

1892 births
1924 deaths
Chicago White Sox players
Cleveland Indians players
Major League Baseball pitchers
Baseball players from Tennessee
Minor league baseball managers
Birmingham Barons players
Venice Tigers players
New Orleans Pelicans (baseball) players
Salt Lake City Bees players
People from Newport, Tennessee